Dersim Dağ (born 2 February 1996, Bismil, Turkey) is a politician of the Peoples Democratic Party (HDP) and a member of the Turkish Parliament. With 22 years of age when elected, she was one of the youngest parliamentarians.

Early life and education    
Dağ was born into a Kurdish family in Bismil and has 12 siblings. Her father was a farmer. In the late 1990s, her family was forced to move Istanbul, where she was grew up. She studies Kurdish language at the Artuklu University in Mardin.

Political career 
As to her own account, she was born into a political family and hence became interested in politics at a young age. In the parliamentary elections of June 2018, she was elected a Member of the Grand National Assembly of Turkey, representing the HDP for Diyarbakır. With both being 22 years of age, Dağ and Rümeysa Kadak of the Justice and Development Party (AKP) were the youngest MPs elected. In parliament, she is a member of the education, youth and culture commission.

Political views 
She defends press freedom, demands better housing conditions for students at the university, is a supporter of education in the Kurdish language and laments the closure of the Kurdish language educational centers Zarokistan set up by the Municipalities run by the fraternal party of the HDP, the Democratic Regions Party (DBP). On 3 March 2019 she announced she would participate in a hunger strike begun by her fellow HDP MP Leyla Güven in protest of the detention conditions of the former leader of the Kurdistan Workers' Party (PKK) Abdullah Öcalan. The same day the HDP office in Diyarbakır was raided by Turkish authorities and several hunger-strikers were detained.  In May Dag ended her hunger strike as their demands were met and Öcalan was able to receive a visit.

Personal life 
Her brother Mazlum Dag has been sentenced to death for murdering a Turkish diplomat in, Erbil, Iraqi Kurdistan.

References 

21st-century Kurdish women politicians
1996 births
Living people
People from Diyarbakır Province
Peoples' Democratic Party (Turkey) politicians
Members of the 27th Parliament of Turkey
Hunger strikers
21st-century Turkish women politicians
Deputies of Diyarbakır